The Old Prison is located in the Citadel of Victoria, Gozo, adjacent to the Courts of Justice to which it was originally connected. Today, the prison complex is divided into two different buildings: the entrance hall, which had been a common cell in the 19th century, and a free-standing block with six individual cells.

The prison was active from the mid-16th century until 1962.

First, it used to host the rowdiest or most riotous knights, as a place to cool down. Even the most historical knight, Fra Jean Parisot de Valette (later Grand Master of Malta) was imprisoned there in 1538.

The site is well preserved in its original state, and one can find a large amount of graffiti etched into the limestone walls. Representations are often of ships, hand-prints, crosses, names, dates, games, and anthropomorphic figures.

References

Museums in Malta
Defunct prisons in Malta
Prison museums in Europe
Victoria, Gozo
Sites managed by Heritage Malta